Kim Ki-duk (20 December 196011 December 2020) was a South Korean film director and screenwriter, noted for his idiosyncratic art-house cinematic works. His films have received many distinctions in the festival circuit, rendering him one of the most important contemporary Asian film directors.

His major festival awards include the Golden Lion at 69th Venice International Film Festival for Pietà, a Silver Lion for Best Director at 61st Venice International Film Festival for 3-Iron, a Silver bear for Best Director at 54th Berlin International Film Festival for Samaritan Girl, and the Un Certain Regard prize at 2011 Cannes Film Festival for Arirang. His most widely known feature is Spring, Summer, Fall, Winter... and Spring (2003), included in film critic Roger Ebert's Great Movies. Two of his films served as official submissions for the Academy Award for Best International Feature Film as South Korean entries. He gave scripts to several of his former assistant directors including Juhn Jai-hong (Beautiful and Poongsan) and Jang Hoon (Rough Cut).

Early life and education
Kim was born on 20 December 1960 in Ponghwa, North Kyŏngsang. In 1990, he went to Paris to study fine arts, but instead he spent two years working there on the streets as a portrait painter. He served for five years in the South Korean Marine Corps, becoming a non-commissioned officer.

Career 
After returning to South Korea, Kim began his career as a screenwriter and won first prize in a screenplay contest held by the Korean Film Council in 1995. In the following year, Kim made his debut as a director with a low budget movie titled Crocodile (1996). The film received sensational reviews from movie critics in South Korea. Ki-duk said that his international breakthrough occurred with The Isle at the Toronto International Film Festival. His 2000 film Real Fiction was entered into the 23rd Moscow International Film Festival.

In 2003, Ki-duk released Spring, Summer, Fall, Winter... And Spring. The film was praised by numerous critics, including critic Peter Bradshaw, who considered the film to be his masterpiece and one of the great works of modern Korean cinema. "A potent and enigmatic parable which manages to be both serene and gripping at the same time [...] It is that rarest of things - a genuinely spiritual film." The film work is included in critic Roger Ebert's Great Movies.

In 2004, he received Best Director awards at two different film festivals, for two different films. At the Berlin International Film Festival, he was awarded for Samaritan Girl (2004), and at the Venice Film Festival he won for 3-Iron (also 2004). In 2011, his documentary film Arirang received an award for best film in the Un Certain Regard category from the Cannes Film Festival. In 2012, his film Pietà received the Golden Lion award at the Venice Film Festival. In 2015, it was announced in Beijing at the Asian Brilliant Stars, a section of the upcoming Berlin International Film Festival that Kim would direct his largest budget to date film Who Is God?, produced by Hollywood producers Stephen Castor and Jim Rygiel (three-time Academy Award winner) under the banner of their production company Its Just Us Productions, along with Chinese production company Film Carnival (Hangzhou). The film was financed by CITIC Guoan, Huafeng Investment Consultation and Its Just Us Productions, (China Daily News).

Personal life

Assault allegations
In August 2017 an actress referred to as "Actress "A" by prosecutors filed a complaint against Kim Ki-duk through Seoul Central District Prosecutor's Office. In the complaint actress accused Kim of slapping her face and forcing her to do an unscripted sex scene on the set of his film Moebius. In December 2017 Seoul Central District Prosecutor's Office fined Kim Ki-duk for $4,450 (KRW 5 million) for physical assault but didn't charge him otherwise citing lack of physical evidence.

On March 6, 2018 the South Korean TV channel MBC's investigative report show PD Notebook aired an episode titled "Movie director Kim Ki-duk, Master's Naked Face" with more accusations from Actress A and two others (Actress B and C as they mentioned in the show). Actresses accused Kim and his frequent collaborator, actor Cho Jae-hyun of verbal and physical sexual harassment and rape. 
In response Kim filed false accusation and defamation suits against the accusers and PD Notebook.

After that on August 7, 2018 MBC aired a second episode of the PD Notebook show "Master's Naked Face. Aftermath" with more accusations from other actresses and staff members against Kim and Cho. In that episode journalists interviewed a Seoul Metropolitan Police Agency's Special Investigation Unit on Sexual Violence official about the cases. The official explained that the police approached the survivors and established the facts behind accusations but could not indict actor Cho and director Kim because of expired statute of limitation.

In January 2019 Seoul Central District Prosecutor's Office decided to drop the criminal lawsuits filed by Kim Ki-duk against actresses and PD Notebook because "there was neither proof that actress' initial accusation was false, nor was there evidence that the news show had been programmed with the purpose of defamation".

In March 2019 Kim Ki-duk filed another lawsuit in civil court against Actress A and PD Notebook seeking $885,740 (KRW 1 billion) in damages. The lawsuit was ruled by court in defendants' favor on October 28, 2020. The court also ordered Kim to pay legal fees for the defendants.

Animal cruelty allegations
The British Board of Film Classification delayed the release of Kim Ki-duk's The Isle (2000) in the United Kingdom because of instances of animal cruelty in the film. Concerning scenes in which a frog is skinned after being beaten to death and fish are mutilated, the director stated, "We cooked all the fish we used in the film and ate them, expressing our appreciation. I've done a lot of cruelty on animals in my films. And I will have a guilty conscience for the rest of my life."

To a U.S. interviewer who suggested that scenes such as these are "very disturbing and [seem] to place an obstacle to the films  reception, or... distribution, to other countries", Kim said, "Yes, I did worry about that fact. But the way I see it, the food that we eat today is no different. In America you eat beef, pork, and kill all these animals. And the people who eat these animals are not concerned with their slaughter. Animals are part of this cycle of consumption. It looks more cruel onscreen, but I don't see the difference. And yes, there's a cultural difference, and maybe Americans will have a problem with it - but if they can just be more sensitive to what is acceptable in different countries I'd hope they wouldn't have too many issues with what's shown on-screen."

Death 
On 11 December 2020, Kim died from complications caused by COVID-19 during the COVID-19 pandemic in Latvia at the age of 59, nine days before his 60th birthday.

Filmography

International awards

References

Notes

Sources

Bibliography 
 
 MARTONOVA, A. (2004) Contemporary Korean cinema – production, tradition and… Kim Ki-Duk. – In: The Plum Blossom. Papers from Korean Studies Conference, Sofia University "St. Kliment Ohridski", Centre for Eastern Languages and Cultures, Sofia: Ex-M, p. 129 – 151
 MARTONOVA, (2012) A. To feel HAN (Arirang by Kim Ki-duk) // Kino, No.3, Sofia:p. 49-47, ISSN 0861-4393 [Да чувстваш ХАН ("Ариран" на Ким Ки-док). — Original title in Bulgarian]
 MARTONOVA, A. (2007) The hieroglyph of cinema. Aesthetics and meaning in East Asia movies. Sofia: Panorama Publishing House, 242 pages,  (in Bulgarian)

External links 

 
 Kim Ki-Duk: the past, the persistent problems and the near future About Kim Ki-Duk's 2006 controversial declarations
 Review of Kim Ki-duk's Time
Working Biography

Cruelty to animals
1960 births
2020 deaths
21st-century South Korean male actors
South Korean male film actors
South Korean film producers
South Korean film directors
South Korean screenwriters
Directors of Golden Lion winners
Venice Best Director Silver Lion winners
Silver Bear for Best Director recipients
Deaths from the COVID-19 pandemic in Latvia
Republic of Korea Marine Corps personnel